Oswulf may refer to

Oswulf of Northumbria, King of Northumbria 758-59
Oswulf of Ramsbury, Bishop of Ramsbury c. 949 to 970